Bill Brooks may refer to:

 Bill Brooks (coach) (1922–2010), American baseball and basketball coach at the University of North Carolina at Wilmington
 Bill Brooks (wide receiver) (born 1964), former wide receiver in the National Football League
 Bill Brooks (American football coach) (1945–2007), American football coach at Canisius College

See also
 William Brooks (disambiguation)
 Bill Brookes, rugby league footballer of the 1900s
 Billy Brooks (born 1953), American football player
 Brooks Field (Wilmington), UNC Wilmington baseball stadium, officially the Bill Brooks Field
 Bud Brooks (1930–2005), American football player for the University of Arkansas in the 1950s